Operation Windsor  was a Canadian attack, which was part of the Battle of Normandy during the Second World War. The attack was originally intended to take place during the later stages of Operation Epsom, to protect the eastern flank of the main assault but was postponed for a week.

On 4 July, the 8th Canadian Infantry Brigade and an attached battalion of the 3rd Canadian Infantry Division attacked Carpiquet, supported on the flanks by the 2nd Canadian Armoured Brigade. The village was captured by mid-afternoon but German resistance in the south defeated two attacks on the airfield, despite significant Allied tank and air support. Next day the Canadians repulsed German counter-attacks and held the village, which served as a base for Operation Charnwood, a Second Army attack on Caen, involving the rest of the 3rd Canadian Infantry Division on 8 July and the airfield was captured by the Canadians on 9 July.

Background
Caen was an Operation Overlord goal for I Corps of the Anglo-Canadian Second Army, which landed forces on two Normandy beaches on 6 June 1944, to capture the city and the Carpiquet area. German resistance prevented the town from being captured on D-Day, a result considered possible by Lieutenant-General Miles Dempsey the Second Army commander. For the next three weeks, positional warfare took place around Caen as both sides attacked and counter-attacked for minor tactical advantage on the Anglo-Canadian front and as part of a strategic intent to force the Germans to keep their most powerful armoured units away from the US First Army, as it captured Cherbourg and then pushed southwards through the bocage towards St. Lô.

From  the Second Army conducted Operation Epsom, with the VIII Corps which had recently arrived from Britain, to outflank Caen from the west and seize the high ground across the Orne near Bretteville-sur-Laize to the south. VIII Corps advanced  through extensive field fortifications but the Germans were able to contain the offensive, after committing their last reserves. Depending on the success of VIII Corps, the 3rd Canadian Infantry Division and the 2nd Canadian Armoured Brigade were to capture the village and airfield of Carpiquet in Operation Ottawa, which was postponed.

After the Allied advance to the west of Caen, the I SS Panzer Corps held positions to the north and west of the city. The village was made an objective of the 3rd Canadian Infantry Division, under the command of Major-General R. F. L. Keller. The Allied need for additional airfields on the Normandy mainland, ensured that the capture of the Carpiquet area was a priority for the Allies and an equally important defensive position for the Germans.

Prelude

German defences

Carpiquet airfield was on a  expanse of level ground, which offered a "killing ground" for the defenders. The airfield had been fortified with minefields, field gun and machine gun emplacements, manned by I Battalion, SS-Panzergrenadier Regiment 26, an anti-aircraft battery and fifteen tanks.

Allied forces
Keller selected the 8th Canadian Infantry Brigade, comprising The Queen's Own Rifles of Canada (QOR), Le Régiment de la Chaudière and The North Shore (New Brunswick) Regiment; The Royal Winnipeg Rifles (RWR) were attached from the 7th Canadian Infantry Brigade to lead the assault. Tank and machine-gun support was to be provided by Canadian 10th Armoured Regiment (The Fort Garry Horse), The Sherbrooke Fusiliers and the Cameron Highlanders Support Battalion. Two squadrons of Hawker Typhoon fighter-bombers and three squadrons of specialized tanks from the British 79th Armoured Division were added later. On the evening of 3 July, the battleship  bombarded the buildings around Carpiquet from the Bay of the Seine at  range, with fifteen shells from its  guns.

Operation Windsor was planned to commence at 05:00 on 4 July, following a bombardment by 21 artillery regiments, with Le Régiment de la Chaudière and The North Shore Regiment attacking Carpiquet, as a squadron of the Sherbrooke Fusiliers protected the northern flank with a diversionary attack on Franqueville. To the south, the RWR was to advance and seize the hangars of Carpiquet airfield. At the same time as the Canadian attack, the 43rd Division was to attack further south down the north side of the Odon to capture Verson. Once the regiments had captured Carpiquet, the QOR would push through and take control of the airfield control buildings. The capture of the airfield would enable further Anglo-Canadian attacks against Caen.

Battle

4 July

At 05:00 two Canadian infantry battalions advanced on Carpiquet, while the Sherbrooke Fusilier squadron staged the diversion to the north. The Sherbooke Fusiliers broke through the German minefields and attacked Chateau-St-Louet and Gruchy before withdrawing but the defensive positions of SS Panzergrenadier Regiment 26 remained intact and continued to fire on the North Shores. In the centre, the Chaudières avoided much of the fire directed at the North Shores as they advanced on Carpiquet. By 06:32, both battalions had reached the outskirts of the village and met tanks of the 12th SS Panzer Division. In the village, a house-to-house fight began and tanks of the 10th Canadian Armoured Regiment assisted the infantry in overrunning German positions.

To the south, the RWR advanced slowly towards the airfield, with German mortar fire inflicting many casualties on the infantry and tanks. Several Sherman tanks were knocked out and by mid-day the RWR were forced to withdraw halfway to their original positions.

Unaware that the RWR had failed to gain control of the airfield, Keller sent the QOR to begin the second phase of the assault. The battalion moved forward into Carpiquet village, which was occupied by the Chaudières and The North Shore, who attacked German strong points bypassed in the initial assault. Infantry attacks, flame-throwers, petard-tanks (Churchill tanks mounted with a  spigot mortar) and the immolation of one strong point forced twelve surviving defenders to surrender; the remaining garrison surrendered after determined resistance. The QOR reached the edge of Carpiquet as the RWR withdrew and was ordered to hold their positions until the RWR reorganized for a second attack.

For the second attack on the airfield, Keller obtained the support of two squadrons of Typhoon fighter-bombers. The survivors of the RWR were ordered to "execute a sweeping attack by the lower ground around the enemy's left flank", with tank and artillery support, under the impression that the 43rd Division had reached Verson, although this position could not prevent a counter-attack from the south-east. In the late afternoon, the RWR resumed the attack on the airfield and reached the hangars but were unable to dislodge the German defenders. The Fort Garry tanks encountered a battlegroup of Panther tanks and was overwhelmed, the RWR was ordered to withdraw to their start-line under the cover of darkness. In Carpiquet, the 8th Canadian Infantry Brigade rapidly consolidated its positions, which were the closest to Caen of any Allied unit. Although the Canadians had control of Carpiquet and the northern hangars, the southern hangars and control buildings remained in German hands.

5 July
With most of the defence concentrated north of Caen and by the River Odon, it was feared that Anglo-Canadian forces could attack from Carpiquet and bypass the majority of the defences. Despite growing misgivings about the effectiveness of immediate counter-attacks, Kurt Meyer ordered the SS to retake Carpiquet. Units from the  prepared to counter-attack Carpiquet from Francqueville with tanks, artillery, mortars and infantry.

Shortly after midnight, the first of the SS counter-attacks began and although thirteen tanks had been lost the previous day, the 10th Canadian Armoured Regiment and the mortars of the Cameron Highlanders, defeated the attack and inflicted many casualties. By dawn, almost no ground had been gained by the attackers and by noon, the 8th Canadian Infantry Brigade and 10th Canadian Armoured Regiment had defeated three counter-attacks, with the assistance of artillery and Typhoon fighter-bombers. The village remained firmly in Canadian occupation, although subject to frequent Nebelwerfer and mortar bombardment.

Aftermath

Analysis

Windsor was the first set-piece attack by the 3rd Canadian Division and left the Germans in control of Carpiquet airport, which obliged the 43rd Division to retire from Verson and Fontaine-Etoupefour. In 2005, Reid wrote that the attack should have been made by two brigades rather than one and an extra battalion. The attached battalion managed to reach the hangars and fight their way through them but were ordered to withdraw twice. The success of the Germans defenders in maintaining their hold on the airfield, except for the north end and Carpiquet village, left the Canadians in a salient which was counter-attacked several times. The failure of the brigade to reach all its objectives, led to doubts about the fitness of Keller for his command, although the preparations for Operation Charnwood might have been the reason for Keller delegating planning for Operation Windsor to the 8th Canadian Infantry Brigade commander, Brigadier K. G. Blackader.

Three days after Operation Windsor, the 3rd Canadian Infantry Division took part in Operation Charnwood. On 9 July, the 8th Canadian Infantry Brigade captured Carpiquet airfield and by nightfall, the northern half of Caen had been captured. On 18 July British and Canadian forces launched Operation Atlantic and Operation Goodwood in which the Canadians captured the Caen districts on the south bank and the British captured ground to the east and south of the city. Canadian forces then attacked German positions on Verrières Ridge in Operation Spring.

Casualties
The RWR and The North Shores each lost  The 10th Canadian Armoured Regiment lost  and an unknown number of tanks were lost by the Sherbrooke Fusiliers.

Citations

References

Further reading

External links

 HQ 8 Cdn Inf Bde, Operation Windsor
 12th SS-Panzer Division in Normandy

Conflicts in 1944
1944 in France
Battle for Caen
Battles of World War II involving Canada
Military history of Canada during World War II
Battles of World War II involving Germany
World War II operations and battles of Europe
Naval battles and operations of World War II involving the United Kingdom
July 1944 events
Canada–Germany relations